Faith Baptist Bible College and Seminary is an undergraduate and graduate Bible college located in Kochi, Kerala, India.

History
Faith Baptist Bible College was established on July 1, 1997 by Dr. Sambhu Nath De.

College programs
 Bachelor of Theology (3 or 4 years course - B.Th.)
 Bachelor of Ministry (3 or 4 years course - B.Min.)
 Bachelor of Religious Education (3 or 4 years course - B.R.E.)
 Master of Divinity (2 or 3 years course - M.Div.)
 Master of Ministry (2 years course - M.Min)
 Master of Religious Education (2 years course - M.R.E.)
 Master of Theology (1 or 2 years course - Th.M.)

Accreditation
Faith Baptist Bible College and Seminary is an accredited by Association of Baptist Bible Colleges & Seminaries in India.

References

External links
 

Seminaries and theological colleges in India
Educational institutions established in 1997
Protestant universities and colleges in Asia
1997 establishments in Kerala